Manvel Ashotovich Agaronyan (born 30 November 1997) is a Russian football player. He plays for FC Luki-Energiya Velikiye Luki.

Club career
He made his debut in the Russian Football National League for FC SKA-Energiya Khabarovsk on 10 August 2015 in a game against FC Baltika Kaliningrad.

On 26 January 2022, Agaronyan joined FC Alashkert in Armenia.

References

External links
 Profile by Russian Football National League

1997 births
People from Aragatsotn Province
Living people
Russian footballers
Association football midfielders
Association football forwards
Russian people of Armenian descent
FC SKA-Khabarovsk players
FC Chernomorets Novorossiysk players
FC Smena Komsomolsk-na-Amure players
FC Alashkert players
Russian First League players
Russian Second League players